Anno uno (internationally released as Year One and Italy: Year One) is a 1974 Italian biographical film directed by Roberto Rossellini. The film tells the story of the political reconstruction of post-fascist Italy between 1944 and 1954, seen through the career of Alcide De Gasperi (1881–1954).

Cast 
 Luigi Vannucchi : Alcide De Gasperi
 Dominique Darel : Maria Romana De Gasperi
 Corrado Olmi : Giuseppe Di Vittorio
 Renato Montanari : Pietro Secchia
 Tino Bianchi : Palmiro Togliatti
 Ennio Balbo : Pietro Nenni
  : Lucia De Gasperi
 Valeria Sabel : Francesca De Gasperi
 Paolo Bonacelli : Giovanni Amendola
 Francesco Di Federico : Giuseppe Saragat
 Omero Antonutti
 Renato Scarpa

References

External links

1974 films
1970s political drama films
Films shot in Matera
Films directed by Roberto Rossellini
Films scored by Mario Nascimbene
Italian political drama films
Biographical films about prime ministers
Cultural depictions of politicians
Cultural depictions of Italian men
1970s Italian-language films
Alcide De Gasperi
1970s Italian films